Nidophis is an extinct genus of Madtsoiid snake that inhabited on Hațeg island in what is now Romania.

References 

Fossil taxa described in 2013
Monotypic snake genera
Fossils of Romania
Cretaceous Romania
Maastrichtian genus extinctions
Prehistoric snakes